Jurkovič or Jurković may refer to:
 
Damir Jurković, Croatian footballer
Dušan Jurkovič, Slovak architect
Igor Jurković, Croatian kickboxer
Ivan Jurkovič, Slovenian catholic prelate
John Jurkovic, American football player
Mirko Jurkovic, American football player
Peter Jurkovič, Czech guitar maker and musician

Croatian surnames
Slovene-language surnames
Slovak-language surnames